The George L. Horn School is an historic school building which is located in the Harrowgate neighborhood of Philadelphia, Pennsylvania.

It was added to the National Register of Historic Places in 1986.

History and architectural features
Built between 1902 and 1904, the George L. Horn School is a three-story, five-bay, ashlar stone building, which was designed in the Late Gothic Revival style. It features terra cotta and granite trim and a steeply pitched gable roof.

It was added to the National Register of Historic Places in 1986. 

For a time the school was known as the Sheridan West Academy before being closed in 2013.

References

School buildings on the National Register of Historic Places in Philadelphia
Gothic Revival architecture in Pennsylvania
School buildings completed in 1904
Port Richmond, Philadelphia
Defunct schools in Pennsylvania
1904 establishments in Pennsylvania